Milan Hluchý (born January 13, 1985) is a Czech professional ice hockey player. He played with HC Karlovy Vary in the Czech Extraliga during the 2010–11 Czech Extraliga season.

References

External links 
 
 

1985 births
Czech ice hockey forwards
HC Karlovy Vary players
Living people
People from Rakovník
Sportspeople from the Central Bohemian Region
Czech expatriate ice hockey players in Canada